Michael Obst (born 30 November 1955) is a German composer and pianist.

Life
Obst was born in Frankfurt am Main.  He studied music education from 1973 to 1978 in Mainz, and from 1977 to 1982 studied piano with Alfons Kontarsky and Aloys Kontarsky at the Hochschule für Musik Köln, where he sat his piano examination in 1982. At the same time, between 1979 and 1986, he studied composition with Hans Ulrich Humpert in the Studio for Elektronic Music of the Hochschule für Musik Köln. From 1981 to 1992 he was the pianist and a founding member of the Ensemble Modern, from 1986 to 1989 he worked as an interpreter with Karlheinz Stockhausen, playing synthesizer in Stockhausen’s operatic cycle Licht.

He was invited to the Studios of Ghent (IPEM), Stockholm (EMS), Bourges (Groupe de musique expérimentale de Bourges), Paris (IRCAM), and Freiburg (SWF-Heinrich Strobel Stiftung) as well as to the Studio for Electronic Music of the Westdeutscher Rundfunk in Cologne. At IRCAM he realized the electronics for his chamber opera Solaris (to a libretto by Stanisław Lem); the opera received its première at the Munich Biennale in 1996. Since 1997 he has been Professor of Composition at the Hochschule für Musik Franz Liszt in Weimar.

From 2010 to 2013 he was a Guest Professor for Composition at the University of Music and performing Arts in Vienna.

In works such as Solaris, Obst adopts a modernist sensibility while at the same time questioning its underlying philosophy.

Selected World Premières and Important Performances
10 Years IRCAM Paris 1987: "Kristallwelt III" for ensemble on tape, commission IRCAM
Donaueschinger Musiktage 1987: "Kristallwelt III" for ensemble and tape
Donaueschinger Musiktage 1989: "Miroirs" for 6 vocalists, commission SWF
Donaueschinger Musiktage 1995: "Diaphonia" for soloists, orchestra and live-electronics, com. SWF
World Music Days (ISCM) Cologne 1987: "Chansons" for Mezzo-Soprano, 5 instruments, live-electronics and tape, commission WDR
Holland-Festival Amsterdam 1990: "Kristallwelt III" for ensemble and tape
10 Years Ensemble Modern, Frankfurt 1990: "Nachtstücke" for 7 instr. + live-el.
Présence ‘92 -jeunes compositeurs- Radio France, Paris: "Fresko" for 5 instruments, commission Radio France
Musik-Kino Philharmonie Cologne 1992: "Dr. Mabuse Part I", music for the silent movie by Fritz Lang for ensemble, commission Philharmonie Cologne
CineMémoire, Paris 1993: "Dr. Mabuse Parts I+II", for ensemble and live-electronics, commission [part II] IRCAM/EIC
Munich Biennale 1996: "Solaris" (première), chamber-opera, co-production with IRCAM/Paris and Munich, commission GEMA-Stiftung Munich
Musik-Triennale 1997 Cologne: "Shadow of a Doubt" for solo percussion and ensemble, commission Philharmonie Cologne
European Cultural City 1999 – Weimar: "Caroline", opera, commission German National Theater Weimar
Le Merveilleuse Festival 2003, Cité de la Musique, Paris: "Nosferatu" (Murnau), music for the silent movie for ensemble, commission Ensemble InterContemporain
Gewandhaus Leipzig 2006: "Espaces sonores" (première) for Wind Quintett and Orchestra, commission from the Radio/TV – Orchestra Leipzig (MDR)
MainFranken Theater Würzburg 2010: "Die andere Seite" (Kubin) (première), commission from the MainFranken Theater Würzburg
 Bayerische Theaterakademie "August Everding" 2013, "Solaris" Chamber Opera, Stage Direction: Kovalik Balázs
 Festival cresc...Biennale für moderne Musik, Frankfurt 2013, "Die Befristeten", concertante radio play after the theatre piece of the same name by Elias Canetti
 Landestheater Linz, 17 September 2016, Austrian première "Solaris", MD: Daniel Linton-France, SD: Hermann Schneider
 Landestheater Linz, 21 May 2017, Austrian première "Die andere Seite", MD: Dennis Russel Davies, SD: John Dew

Discography
METAL DROPS ,Inside–metal drop music–Ye–Na–Je, electroacoustic music, CD Wergo WER SM 1043–2
CRYSTAL WORLD ,Crystal World I–III, electroacoustic music,CD Wergo WER 2011–50
MICHAEL OBST, Kristallwelt III–Fresko–Nachtstücke, EIC/IRCAM, CD Adès 205832
Diaphonia, SWF–Sinfonieorchester/Gielen, Donaueschingen 1995, CD col legno WWE 31898
Fábrica, electroacoustic music, composers of Nordrhein Westfalen (Germany), CD Koch–Schwann 3–5037–3
Oktett für Bläserensemble, Bläserensemble Sabine Meyer, EMI Records 7243-5-57084-2-7
Trio No 2 for Violin, Violoncello and Piano, Abegg Trio, TACET Records 174

Television Productions
DR MABUSE, DER SPIELER Ensemble InterContemporain – Ann Manson, ZDF-ARTE 1996
SOLARIS Biennale München-Xsemble München – Musical Director: Peter Rundel Stage Director: Anja Sündermann, Bayerischer Rundfunk 1996

Compositions

Stage works

Other works

 1980/81 Metal Drop Music, quadraphonic electronic music
 1980/83 Piano Piece no. 3 for piano solo
 1981 Resonanzen 1 for violoncello solo
 1981/88 Traumlandschaften for 2 pianos
 1981/82 Inside, quadrophonic electronic music
 1982 YE-NA-JE stereophonic electronic music
 1983 Visioni di Medea, quadrophonic electronic music
 1983–85 Crystal World I, quadrophonic electronic music
 1984 Crystal World II (Chorale), quadrophonic electronic music
 1985/86 Crystal World III, quadrophonic electronic music
 1985/86 Crystal World III for ensemble and tape
 1987 Chansons for mezzo-soprano, 5 instruments, live-electronics, and tape
 1987 Ende Gut, quadrophonic electronic music 
 1989 Poèmes for percussion solo and tape
 1989 Miroirs for 6 vocalists 
 1990 Dr. Mabuse Der Spieler Part I: Der große Spieler for ensemble and live-electronics (film music for the restored complete version of the silent film "Dr. Mabuse, der Spieler" by Fritz Lang)
 1990–92 Poèmes, "d'après des images en blanc et noir" for orchestra
 1990 Nachtstücke for 7 instruments and live-electronics 
 1991 Fresko for 5 instruments 
 1991 Nuances for flute and percussion
 1992–93 Dr. Mabuse Der Spieler Part II: Inferno for ensemble and live-electronics (film music for the restored complete version of the silent film "Dr. Mabuse, der Spieler" by Fritz Lang)
 1993–94 Diaphonia for soloists, orchestra and live-electronics
 1994 Fábrica I, stereophonic electronic music 
 1995 Fábrica II for 4 percussionists and tape
 1996 Journey's End, quadrophonic electronic music
 1997 Shadow (...of a Doubt), for percussion and ensemble
 1998 Traces for oboe solo 
 1998 Suite for bass clarinet, accordion and double bass
 1998 Octet for Winds
 1998/99 Piano Piece no. 5 for piano solo
 1998/99 Reflections for accordion solo
 2000 The Wind for violin, French horn and tape
 2000 Images for violin solo
 2000 Six Sketches for French horn solo
 2001 Piano Trio no. 1
 2001 Transit, for orchestra
 2002 Nosferatu, (music for the classic silent film by Friedrich Wilhelm Murnau) 
 2003/04 Espaces Sonores, 8-track electronic music
 2004–05 Espaces sonores, for wind quintet and orchestra
 2006 Arcus for string quartet and electronic music
 2006 Piano Trio no. 2 
 2009 Trois Rêves for ensemble
 2009 Four Little Pieces for B-flat clarinet
 2013 Die Befristeten, concertante radio play for speakers and ensemble after the theatre piece of the same name by Elias Canetti (text adaptation by Ursula Ruppel)
 2013–14 Variazioni for two trumpets and two ensembles
 2014 Te Deum for six-part mixed choir
 2016 Noctuelles for 11 instruments

Writings by Michael Obst (selection)
De nouveau critère pour apprécier la musique electroacoustique in: Esthétique et Musique Electroacoustique, Paris 1996, pp. 71–76
Neue Musik (-festival)? in: Festschrift 75 Jahre Donaueschinger Musiktage, Donaueschingen 1996, pp. 77–80
Fábrica – analyse structurelle in: Analyse en Musique Electroacoustique, Bourges 1997, pp. 155–159
Projection du son prise comme élément compositionnel, La fonction de l'électronique en direct dans mon opéra *Solaris in: Composition/Diffusion en Musique Electroacoustique, Bourges 1998, pp. 142–150
La musique – pourquoi? in: Musique Electroacoustique: expérience et prospective, Bourges 1999, pp. 116–117

References

Further reading

External links 
 
 Michael Obst's official website
 

1955 births
Living people
German classical composers
20th-century classical composers
21st-century classical composers
Hochschule für Musik und Tanz Köln alumni
German male classical composers
20th-century German composers
21st-century German composers
Academic staff of the Hochschule für Musik Franz Liszt, Weimar
20th-century German male musicians
21st-century German male musicians